Teruhisa (written: 輝久, 照久, 煌久 or 勘之亟) is a masculine Japanese given name. Notable people with the name include:

 (1939–1986), Japanese sumo wrestler
 (born 1954), Japanese author and video game developer
 (1888–1970), Imperial Japanese Navy admiral
 (1926–2006), Japanese-born American mathematician
 (born 1942), Japanese volleyball player
 (born 1936), Japanese sumo wrestler
 (born 1965), Japanese voice actor

Japanese masculine given names